The women's 4 × 400 metres relay event at the 2013 Summer Universiade was held on 12 July.

Results

References
Results

Relay
2013